Winter in the Woods is a 1956 German drama film directed by Wolfgang Liebeneiner and starring Claus Holm. It is a remake of the 1936 film Winter in the Woods. The film's sets were designed by the art directors Paul Markwitz and Fritz Maurischat. Location shooting took place at Viechtach in Bavaria.

Cast

References

Bibliography

External links

1956 films
1956 drama films
German drama films
West German films
1950s German-language films
Films directed by Wolfgang Liebeneiner
Films set in Bavaria
Films shot in Bavaria
Films set in forests
Remakes of German films
1950s German films